Linnea Viktoria Liljegärd (born 8 December 1988) is a Swedish former footballer who played for the Sweden women's national football team as well as professional clubs in Sweden, Norway and Russia.

Club career
Liljegärd was raised in Vårgårda and began her career with Skogsbygdens IF. After three years with Falköpings KIK she joined Kopparbergs/Göteborg FC in 2008. In 2009 Liljegärd was the top scorer in the Damallsvenskan with 22 goals. She turned down approaches from WPS club Sky Blue FC and Swedish champions Linköpings FC in order to stay with Göteborg.

In September 2012 Göteborg accepted an offer for Liljegärd from WFC Rossiyanka and she transferred to the Russian club. In January 2013 she opted out of her contract and returned to Sweden for surgery on a foot injury. After recovering she signed for Norwegian Toppserien club Avaldsnes IL.

She returned to Sweden with Damallsvenskan club Kristianstads DFF in August 2013. Liljegärd announced her retirement from playing in November 2014, aged 25, to focus on coaching Division 2 team Bergdalens IK. She had lost her motivation but did not rule out a comeback.

International career
Liljegärd represented Sweden at all youth levels, then won her first senior cap in a 5–1 friendly win over Norway in January 2009. She was subsequently named in the Sweden squad for Euro 2009.

Despite good form at domestic level, in June 2011 Liljegärd was left out of Sweden's squad for the World Cup in Germany.

References

External links
  (archive)
 
 National team profile 2008 
  

Living people
1988 births
Footballers from Uppsala
Swedish women's footballers
Sweden women's international footballers
BK Häcken FF players
Damallsvenskan players
Expatriate women's footballers in Norway
Expatriate women's footballers in Russia
WFC Rossiyanka players
Avaldsnes IL players
Toppserien players
Kristianstads DFF players
Swedish expatriate women's footballers
Swedish expatriate sportspeople in Norway
Women's association football forwards